The Cambodia women's national football team() is a women's football team representing Cambodia and controlled by Football Federation of Cambodia (FFC). the team's first activity was in 2018, where they debuted in the AFF Women's Championship.

History
Both were recruited through FIFA's Spirit of Soccer program and worked to bring the game to areas with land mines. By 2012, between Battambang or Phnom Penh, there were 400 girls playing in organised clubs. In 2009, the Com-Unity Women's Football Seminar was held Phnom Penh.

Chheun Nipha from Cambodia participated in a 2012 AFC 'C' Coaching Certificate Course organised as part of the AFC U-13 Girls' Football Tournament 2012. In 2012, the women's team participated in the Charity Cup, a competition designed to help with fundraising to send a team to compete at the Homeless World Cup. In May 2012, an under-15 women's football festival was held in Cambodia, organised by the German embassy and German Business Group Cambodia, and held at the University of Battambang.

Cambodia played their first FIFA-recognised matches in 2018 at the AFF Women's Championship. They won their first match, a 12–0 victory over Timor-Leste on 30 June 2018. They lost their other three group stages matches, all without scoring another goal. Cambodia entered the AFF Women's Championship again in 2019 and 2022. They lost all their group stage games in 2019. They fared better in 2022, defeating Timor-Leste again and drawing their match against Laos by a 1–1 score. Nevertheless, they did not advance out of the group stage. Beyond the AFF Women's Championship, Cambodia participated in the Southeast Asian Games in 2021, losing both their games and not scoring any goals. The captain of the team in their first tournament in 2018 was Hout Koemhong, who grew up in an orphanage and trained at SALT Academy for six years. The captain in 2022 was Ban Cheavey.

Under-16
The Cambodia women's national under-16 football team has been coached by Sam Schweingruber since it was created in 2009.  The team played in their first FIFA recognised and sponsored international in spring of 2009 when they played Laos on 22 May. Two players on the 2009 under-16 team were Nin and Vesna, a pair of sisters from the SALT Academy.  The sisters had been sexually exploited in Thailand but while at the Academy, they developed their skills. Nin eventually became the captain of the team.

Under-14
Kauw was a member of the Cambodia women's national under-14 football team in 2011.  The assistant coach was Chhoeurn Nipha and the head coach was Sam Schweingruber. The country participated in the AFC U-14 Girls' Festival of Football in Vietnam, where like the other ten participating countries, they fielded two teams. At the competition, Cambodia lost to the Philippines 3–0.

Under-13
The Cambodia women's national under-13 football team competed in the June 2012 AFC Girls Football Festival against other national sides from Thailand, Myanmar, the Philippines, Guam and Vietnam. The team played their first match against the Philippines. Cambodia lost to Vietnam 0–1 in the bronze medal game.  The team is coached by Sam Schweingruber.

Results and fixtures

2022

2023

Coaching staff

Current coaching staff

Players

Current squad
The following 23 players were called up for the 2022 AFF Women's Championship in Philippines from 4–17 July 2022.
Caps and goals are updated as of 13 July 2022 after the match against .

Records

*Players in bold are still active, at least at club level.

Most capped players

Top goalscorers

Record per opponent

Source: Soccerway

Tournament

AFF Championship

Southeast Asian Games

Source: Soccerway

References

External links
Cambodia women's national football team – website at FFCambodia.com
Cambodia at FIFA.com

Asian women's national association football teams